Dhi Bin, also spelled Dhibin or Dhaybin, is a small town in 'Amran Governorate, Yemen, and the seat of Dhi Bin District.

Name and history 
According to the 10th-century writer al-Hamdani, Dhi Bin is named after Dhu Bin b. Bakīr b. Nawfān, of the tribe of Hamdan. It was a moderately important site during the late medieval and early modern eras, and is mentioned frequently in Yahya ibn al-Husayn's historical account, the Ghayat al-amani.

References 

Populated places in 'Amran Governorate